Sjoeke Nüsken (born 22 January 2001) is a German footballer who plays as a midfielder for Eintracht Frankfurt and the Germany women's national team.

Career
Nüsken made her international debut for Germany on 21 February 2021, coming on as a substitute in the 73rd minute for Sara Däbritz in a friendly match against Belgium. The home match finished as a 2–0 win for Germany.

Career statistics

International

International goal
Scores and results list Germany's goal tally first:

References

External links
 
 
 
 

2001 births
Living people
Sportspeople from Hamm
Footballers from North Rhine-Westphalia
German women's footballers
Germany women's youth international footballers
Germany women's international footballers
Women's association football midfielders
1. FFC Frankfurt players
Eintracht Frankfurt (women) players
Frauen-Bundesliga players